Robert Madden may refer to:

 Bobby Madden (born 1978), Scottish football referee
 Bobby Madden (cricketer) (1928-2008), Australian cricketer
 Robert Bruce Madden (born 1944), Kansas state legislator
 Robert P. Madden (1928-2014), president of the Optical Society of America in 1982
 Robert W. Madden, staff photographer for National Geographic magazine